Unsolicited advertisement comprise all of, but are not limited to:
Traditional junk mail ("direct mailing", in industry terms)
Spamming, in particular
Email spam,
Telemarketing nuisance calls,
Junk faxes,
Unsolicited goods, etc.
for advertising and marketing purposes which are sent without request.

Unsolicited advertising usually violates informational self-determination, when the addresses to which advertising material is delivered have not been explicitly communicated to the sender by the addressee, i.e. no opt-in was done.

The FCC defines "unsolicited advertisement" as:
 
Whereas traditional postal advertisements produce huge amounts of waste paper and plastic waste, modern electronic forms consume bandwidth and data storage space.
Various methods exist for prevention of and defense against unsolicited advertisements, including opt-out from email lists, entry in blocking lists, like Robinson lists or the National Do Not Call Registry, etc.. Legislation has produced countermeasures like the Telephone Consumer Protection Act.

See also
Targeted advertising
Attention theft

References

Further reading
Fax Advertising Policy
Marketing and advertising: the law
Ads

Advertising
Spamming